Will James may refer to:
 Will James (artist) (1892–1942), Canadian-born western artist and author
 Will James (rugby, born 1902) (1902–1972), Welsh rugby union and league player
 Will James (rugby union, born 1976), Welsh rugby union player
 Will James, bassist for Papa Roach

See also
 Willy F. James Jr. (1920–1945), Medal of Honor recipient
 William James (disambiguation)
 Bill James (disambiguation)